Thrikkadavoor  is a town and a neighbourhood of Kollam city in the state of Kerala, India.
It is located approximately 5 kilometres north of Kollam city centre and 30 kilometres away from Paravur, Thrikkadavoor  has become a bustling urban center, and is now home to educational institutions, five star hotel, local business establishments and major recent real estate ventures Thrikkadavoor was a separate panchayath till 2015. In May 2015, Government of Kerala have decided to expand City Corporation of Kollam by merging Thrikkadavoor panchayath.

Education

Schools
G.H.S.S Anchalummoodu, kollam
S.N.D.P H.S.S Neeravil, Kollam
LP School Anchalummodu
Lower primary school Mathilil
LKG & UKG school Mathilil
St. George UP School Mathilil
Thrikkadavoor LPS
Govt UPS Kureepuzha
Maria Agnes English Medium Convent School, Kureepuzha
Sacred Heart School, Kureepuzha
N.S.S Central School, Kottackakom
Govt UP School, Kureepuzha

Training colleges
Kasthoorba Gandhi TTI, Mathilil. It is owned by Kasthoorba Gandhi memorial women’s charitable society registered under Travancore Cochin Charitable Society’s Act. About 50 women irrespective of caste, creed or politics are members of the society. This is the only TTI in the state which is run by a women’s organization.
Nalanda Academy Anchalummood
KNG Unnithan Study centre, Kadavoor
Reliance College Anchalummoodu
ALPHA Study Centre, Kadavoor 
Venus study centre, Kureepuzha
Prime Group of Institution,Mathilil
Link label

Railway Station
Kollam Junction railway station (6 km)
Perinad Railway Station

Mahadeva Temple

Thrikkadavoor Sree Mahadeva Temple 5 km northwest of Kollam with golden flag staff, 10 days festival in Kumbhom - Thiruvathira Aaratu. 101 Kudam (pot) Kalasam, Chathussatham are offering.
The Thrikkadavoor Mahadeva Temple is the most famous Siva Temple in Kollam District. It is situated in the Thrikkadavoor Panchayath and on the banks of the Ashtamudi lake. Mrikandu rishi and his wife Marudmati worshipped Shiva and sought from him the boon of begetting a son. As a result, he was given the choice of either a gifted son, but with a short life on earth or a child of low intelligence but with a long life. Mrikandu rishi chose the former, and was blessed with Markandeya, an exemplary son, destined to die at the age of 16.

Markandeya grew up to be a great devotee of Shiva and on the day of his destined death he continued his worship of Shiva in his aniconic form of Shivalingam. The messengers of Yama, the god of death were unable to take away his life because of his great devotion and continual worship of Shiva. Yama then came in person to take away Markandeya's life, and sprung his noose around the young sage's neck. By accident or fate the noose mistakenly landed around the Shivalingam, and out of it, Shiva emerged in all his fury attacking Yama for his act of aggression. After defeating Yama in battle to the point of death, Shiva then revived him, under the condition that the devout youth would live forever. For this act, Shiva was thereafter known also as Kalantaka ("Ender of Death"). This was said to have happened in Thirukkadavoor also call Thrikkadavoor.
Thus Maha Mrityunjaya Stotra is also attributed to Markandeya,[4] and this legend of Shiva conquering death is inscribed in metal and worshipped at Thirukkadavoor mahadeva temple.
The annual Srattu festival attracts thousands of people, including foreigners. The festival falls in the month of Kumbham (February/March). The eight artificial horses, which represent the eight areas (karas) around the temple, is a special attraction for tourists.
May be the world's only one Nedumkuthira (Eduppukuthira- men carrying vertical horse-chariot) procession through water witnessed by global tourists.

Other Temples
Sri Subramanya Swami Temple, Mathilil
Sri Velayudha Mangalam Temple, Kuppana
Sree Bhadra Kali Temple, Panamoodu
Venkekkara Devi Temple, Mathilil
Edavanatt Devi Temple, Mathilil
Punthala Temple, Mathilil
Keelattu Sree Shakthi Bhairavi Temple, Kadavoor
Kunnathuvila Bhadra Kali Temple, Kadavoor
Bhoothakkavu Devi Temple, Kadavoor
Sree Ayiravillan siva-parvathy Temple, Kureepuzha
Ayyankaoiyikkal Sree Dharma shastha Temple, Kureepuzha
Kochu Pathinettam padi Ayyappa Temple, Kureepuzha
Thottumkara Sree Bhagavathy  Temple, Kureepuzha
Aakkal Sree Parthasaradhi Temple, Kureepuzha
Kalariyil Sree Balabhadradevi Temple, Kureepuzha
Plavara Sree Durgadevi Temple, Kureepuzha
Sree Badra Devi Temple, Viraliyil, Kottackakom
Mavanazhikathu Sri Durga Devi Temple, Kuppana
Sri Ganapathy Temple, Kuppana
Kolleriyil Sri MahaDeva Shiva Temple, Kuppana
Pongumthazha Temple, Kuppana

Notable Persons
Kadavoor Sivadasan, Politician
KNG Unnithan, Professor, Mathematician
N Divakaran (Baby), politician, panchayath President
Kadavoor Santhosh Chandran, Musician
Vikas V, IFS Indian Forest Service Officer
P Vivekanandan, Professor, Physics
Kadavoor Balan, Politician, Educationalist, Kadhaprasangam

Demographics
 India census, Thrikkadavoor had a population of 38141 with 18674 males and 19467 females.

References

External links

Neighbourhoods in Kollam
Villages in Kollam district